The 2013 Lombard regional election took place on 24 and 25 February 2013 and was the first snap election in Lombard political history, and the first one paired with a general election. The 10th term of the Regional Council was chosen.

Electoral system
Lombardy used for the first time its own legislation to elect its Council, very similar to national Tatarella Law of 1995. The new electoral law was adopted before the resignation of 74 members of the Council on October 26, 2012. While the President of Lombardy and the leader of the opposition are still elected at-large, 78 councillors, instead of 64 as it was before, are elected by party lists under a form of semi-proportional representation. The winning coalition receives a jackpot of at least 45 seats, which are divided between all majority parties using the D'Hondt method, as it happens between the losing lists. Each party then distributes its seats to its provincial lists, where candidates are openly selected.

Campaign
On 16 October 2012, Formigoni announced the dissolution of the regional legislature after one of his commissioners, Domenico Zambetti of the PdL was arrested on accusations he bought votes from the 'Ndrangheta in 2010 and extorted favours and public building contracts, including construction tenders for the World Expo 2015 in Milan.

Center-left primary election, 2012
On 15 December 2012 the center-left primary election took place to decide the official candidate of the coalition in the election.  There were three candidates: Umberto Ambrosoli, son of Giorgio killed in 1979, Alessandra Kustermann and Andrea Di Stefano. Umberto Ambrosoli received the 57% of the votes and became the center-left official candidate for the regional election.

Parties and candidates

Results
According to the final results, Roberto Maroni was the new President of Lombardy with more than 40% of the votes, obtaining the greater bonus given by the electoral law.

Results by province

Results by capital city

Seats by province

References

Regional elections in Lombardy
2013 elections in Italy
February 2013 events in Italy